Zaida James is a Saint Lucian cricketer who plays for the Windward Islands women's cricket team in the Women's Super50 Cup and the Twenty20 Blaze tournaments. In April 2021, James was named in Cricket West Indies' high-performance training camp in Antigua. In June 2021, James was named in the West Indies A Team for their series against Pakistan.

International career
On 30 January 2023, it was announced that James had been added to the West Indies squad for the 2022–23 South Africa women's Tri-Nation Series. She made her Twenty20 International debut later that day, against India at Buffalo Park, East London in South Africa.

References

External links
 

Year of birth missing (living people)
Living people
Windward Islands women cricketers
Place of birth missing (living people)
Guyana Amazon Warriors (WCPL) cricketers